Events from the year 1138 in Ireland.

Incumbents
High King: Toirdelbach Ua Conchobair

Events

Deaths
Cormac Mac Carthaig,  King of Munster.

References